Luzki may refer to the following places in Poland:
Łuzki, Łosice County, Masovian Voivodeship
Łuzki, Sokołów County, Masovian Voivodeship
Łużki, Masovian Voivodeship
Łużki, Pomeranian Voivodeship